Luis Ricardo Silva Umbelino (born 21 January 1984), known as Luis Ricardo, is a Brazilian footballer who plays for Portuguesa. Mainly a right back, he can perform equally as a right midfielder.

Career
Born in Goiânia, Luis Ricardo began his professional career on Grêmio, and played for Marcílio Dias. After this, he signed a contract with Avaí. However, he failed to impress in the club, and was loaned to Ponte Preta and Mirassol. After the end of 2009 Campeonato Paulista, he returned to Avaí. He was a starter in a brilliant 2009 Série A made by Avaí, and on 5 February 2010, he was transferred to Portuguesa.

On 2013, after three years playing for Portuguesa de Desportos, Luis Ricardo was honored by fans of club. A big screen, in the game against Grêmio FBPA, for the last date of Brazilian League, showed his main moments for Lusa. In 2014, Ricardo will play for São Paulo FC.

Honours
Portuguesa
Campeonato Brasileiro Série B: 2011
Campeonato Paulista Série A2: 2013

Botafogo
Campeonato Brasileiro Série B: 2015
Campeonato Carioca: 2018

Portuguesa
Campeonato Paulista Série A2: 2022

References

External links
 

1984 births
Living people
Sportspeople from Goiânia
Brazilian footballers
Campeonato Brasileiro Série A players
Campeonato Brasileiro Série B players
Campeonato Brasileiro Série C players
Vila Nova Futebol Clube players
Grêmio Foot-Ball Porto Alegrense players
Associação Atlética Ponte Preta players
Mirassol Futebol Clube players
Avaí FC players
Associação Portuguesa de Desportos players
São Paulo FC players
Botafogo de Futebol e Regatas players
Figueirense FC players
Esporte Clube Água Santa players
Oeste Futebol Clube players
Association football forwards